Astronome is an album by John Zorn featuring the "Moonchild Trio" of Joey Baron, Mike Patton and Trevor Dunn. It is the second album by the trio, following Moonchild: Songs Without Words.

Theater director Richard Foreman staged an opera Astronome: A Night at the Opera: An Initiation based on this album which premiered at the Ontological-Hysteric Theater on February 5, 2009, and ran through April 5, 2009.

Track listing

Musicians 
 Joey Baron – drums
 Mike Patton – voice
 Trevor Dunn – bass

References 

Tzadik Records albums
Moonchild albums
Albums produced by John Zorn
2006 albums